Cockaigne (In London Town), Op. 40, also known as the Cockaigne Overture, is a concert overture for full orchestra written by the British composer Edward Elgar in 1900–1901.

History
The success of the Enigma Variations in 1899 was followed by the initial failure of The Dream of Gerontius, which caused Elgar to become dispirited and declare that God was against art. Nevertheless, he received a commission from the Royal Philharmonic Society and began work on a new piece and soon reported that it was "cheerful and Londony, 'stout and steaky'...honest, healthy, humorous and strong, but not vulgar."

The first performance was in the Queen's Hall, London at a Royal Philharmonic Society Concert, on 20 June 1901, conducted by the composer. He dedicated the work to his "many friends, the members of British orchestras." The music was an immediate success and became one of Elgar's most popular works. It has been performed in the concert hall less frequently in recent decades.

Description
In its 15 minutes or so the overture gives a lively and colourful musical portrait of Edwardian London. 'Cockaigne' was a term used by moralists at that time as a metaphor for gluttony and drunkenness, while Britain adopted the name humorously for London. The work presents various aspects of turn-of-the-century London and Londoners. It begins with a quiet but bustling theme which leads into an unbroken sequence of snapshots: the cockneys, the church bells, the romantic couples, a slightly ragged brass band (perhaps the Salvation Army) and a contrastingly grand and imperious military band. The broad theme representing Londoners is, Michael Kennedy states, the first occurrence of Elgar’s trademark direction, 'nobilmente.'. The work ends in a characteristically Elgarian blaze of orchestral sound, including a full organ.

Mindful, perhaps, of the way Elgar brings his themes together at the climax of the piece, both Bernard Shaw and W. H. "Billy" Reed compared the work to Richard Wagner's Die Meistersinger von Nürnberg Prelude, which culminates in the combination of several themes. Shaw, in a long article on Elgar in 1920, wrote:

But if you say that Elgar's Cockaigne overture combines every classic quality of a concert overture with every lyrical and dramatic quality of the overture to Die Meistersinger, you are either uttering a platitude as safe as a compliment to Handel on the majesty of the "Hallelujah" Chorus, or else damning yourself to all critical posterity by uttering a gaffe that will make your grandson blush for you. Personally, I am prepared to take the risk. What do I care for my grandson? Give me Cockaigne.

Reed wrote:

The Cockaigne Overture does not eclipse the Mastersingers prelude, but neither is it outshone by Wagner's most symphonically satisfying introductory composition from which it actually borrows some procedures. Elgar's piece is as splendidly evocative a picture of Edwardian London as Wagner's is of medieval Nuremberg, and there is nothing to choose between the two in humour, mastery of construction and appositeness of scoring.

Recordings
Cockaigne is well represented on record. Elgar himself recorded it twice (in 1926 and 1933). Recordings available or recently available in January 2007 included:
 
Sir John Barbirolli/Philharmonia Orchestra (EMI)
Eugene Ormandy/Philadelphia Orchestra (Sony)
Sir Adrian Boult/London Philharmonic Orchestra (EMI)
Sir Colin Davis/London Symphony Orchestra (Philips Records)
Sir Andrew Davis/BBC Symphony Orchestra (Warner Classics)
Mark Elder/Hallé Orchestra (Hallé)
Sir Georg Solti/London Philharmonic Orchestra (Decca Records)
André Previn/London Symphony Orchestra (Philips Records)
Sir Alexander Gibson/Royal Scottish National Orchestra (Chandos Records)
Bramwell Tovey/Winnipeg Symphony Orchestra (CBC Records SMCD 5176)
Vernon Handley/London Philharmonic Orchestra (EMI / Classics For Pleasure)
Peter Richard Conte/transcribed for the Wanamaker Organ (Gothic)

References
Kennedy, Michael: 'Elgar Orchestral Music', BBC, London, 1970
Reed, W.H.: 'Elgar', J M Dent & Sons, London, 1943.
Laurence, Dan (ed): 'Shaw's Music', Volume III, Bodley Head, London, 1981, 
Heath, Edward: 'Music', Sidgwick and Jackson, London, 1976, 
The Elgar Society and The Elgar Foundation
Madison Symphony Orchestra Program Notes by Michael Allsen

Notes

External links 
 

Compositions by Edward Elgar
Concert overtures
1901 compositions
Music for orchestra and organ
Music about London